Elaine Breeden Penrose (born November 18, 1988), née Elaine Breeden, is an American competition swimmer and Olympic silver medalist.

Breeden qualified to compete in the 100-meter and 200-meter butterfly events at the 2008 Summer Olympics by placing second and first, respectively, in those events at the U.S. Olympic Trials.  At the 2008 Olympics in Beijing, China, she advanced to the semifinals of the women's 100-meter butterfly, and finished seventh in the final of the women's 200-meter butterfly.  She earned a silver medal by swimming for the second-place U.S. team in the preliminary heats of the women's 4×100-meter medley relay.

Breeden attended Stanford University, and swam for the Stanford Cardinal women's swimming and diving team in National Collegiate Athletic Association (NCAA) competition from 2007 to 2010.  As a college swimmer, she was a three-time NCAA national champion in the 200-yard butterfly (2007, 2009, 2010), as well as the NCAA champion in the 100-yard butterfly (2010).  She received a total of 24 All-American honors.

See also
 List of Olympic medalists in swimming (women)
 List of Stanford University people

References

External links
 
 
 
 
 
 

1988 births
Living people
Sportspeople from Lexington, Kentucky
American female butterfly swimmers
Medalists at the 2008 Summer Olympics
Olympic silver medalists for the United States in swimming
Stanford Cardinal women's swimmers
Swimmers at the 2008 Summer Olympics
Swimmers at the 2011 Pan American Games
Pan American Games gold medalists for the United States
Pan American Games bronze medalists for the United States
Pan American Games medalists in swimming
Universiade medalists in swimming
Sportswomen from Kentucky
Universiade silver medalists for the United States
Medalists at the 2007 Summer Universiade
Medalists at the 2011 Pan American Games